The Calgary Public Library (CPL) is a distributed library system featuring 21 branch locations including the Central Library. It is the second most used system in Canada (after the Toronto Public Library) and the sixth most used library system in North America. This is despite the fact that the Calgary Public Library has one of the lowest per capita funding in the country, receiving as little as half the money of other Canadian public libraries.

History 
The Calgary Public Library Board of Trustees was established on May 18, 1908. R. B. Bennett, who would later serve as Prime Minister of Canada, was among the five people appointed to the board. The first public library opened on January 2, 1912, thanks in part to the generosity of Scottish / American industrialist and philanthropist Andrew Carnegie.

Carnegie funded $80,000 of the $100,000 cost of Calgary's Central Library, (now renamed the Memorial Park Branch), pressuring City Hall to fund the rest.

The building was the first purpose-built public library in Alberta.  It was designed by Boston architects McLean & Wright, and built out of local Paskapoo Sandstone (a soft stone that today presents a substantial preservation challenge). This library branch is a copy of a library in Attleboro, Massachusetts.

In 1929 the formal Victorian-style park surrounding the Central Library was dedicated to the honour of those who had died in the Great War. During construction of the original building, the Calgary Library Board sought out a librarian to oversee the opening of its new library. In January 1911, Alexander Calhoun, a thirty-one-year-old graduate of Queen's University, was appointed Calgary's Librarian. Calhoun served as the head of the Calgary Public Library until his retirement in 1945.

When a new downtown central library was constructed in the early 1960s, the original branch was renamed the Memorial Park branch, and still operates today. An addition to the 1960s Central Library was built in 1974, doubling the size of the building.

21st century
In 2013, CNOOC subsidiary Nexen donated 1.5M dollars to the Calgary Public Library. The company has secured the naming rights for high tech learning commons in the new Calgary Central Library. CNOOC CEO Li Fanrong reiterated the gesture was motivated by the company's corporate responsibilities to Calgary. There have been concerns of censorship as CNOOC is a Chinese state run company, however McIntyre Royston library foundation head assures that the library's collection won't be censored.

The location of the new library is in the Downtown East Village (just across 3rd St. S.E. from the new City Hall). On February 25, 2013, City Hall was approved the master plan to have the new library be built at the fore-mentioned location at Downtown East Village with the overall cost of C$245 million. The 286,000-square foot complex was completed on November 1, 2018.

In 2019, the new library was recognized as one of "The Worlds 100 Greatest Places of 2019" by Time magazine.

In 2019, Calgary opened Seton Library at the World's Largest YMCA (Brookfield Residential YMCA at Seton).

During the COVID-19 pandemic, the library introduced expanded online services for patrons and provided health resources developed by 19 to Zero, a health communications initiative led by Alberta students.

Branches

Southwest Community Libraries
Giuffre Family Library (1954-) - 3223 14 Street SW
Memorial Park Library (1912-) - 1221 2 Street SW (closed as a branch between 1967-1977 and used as a storage facility)
Nicholls Family Library (2016-) - 1421 33 Street SW (at Westbrook LRT station)
Signal Hill Library (1998-) - 5994 Signal Hill Centre SW
Southwood Library (1966-) - 924 Southland Drive SW

Southeast Community Libraries
Central Library (2018-) - 800 3 Street SE (replaced former W.R. Castell Central Library)
Fish Creek Library (1985-) - 11161 Bonaventure Drive SE
Forest Lawn Library (1962-) - 4807 8 Avenue SE (Forest Lawn opened as a town library in 1951, joining the Calgary system in 1962)
Quarry Park Library (2016-)- 108 Quarry Park Road SE (at Remington YMCA)
Seton Library (2019-) - 4995 Market Street SE (at Brookfield Residential YMCA)
Shawnessy Library (2001-) - 333 Shawville Boulevard S.E. (at Cardel Rec South)

Northwest Community Libraries
Bowness Library (2012-) - 6532 Bowness Road NW (New location opened 2012. Bowness opened as a town library in 1958, joining the Calgary system in 1964.)
Crowfoot Library (2003-) - 8665 Nose Hill Drive NW
Judith Umbach Library (1974-) - 6617 Centre Street N
Louise Riley Library (1959-) - 1904 14 Avenue NW
Nose Hill Library (1988-) - 1530 Northmount Drive NW
Rocky Ridge Library (2017-) - 11300 Rocky Ridge Road NW (at Shane Homes YMCA)
Sage Hill Library (2017-) - 19 Sage Hill Passage NW - Temporary Library until final Sage Hill Library is completed

Northeast Community Libraries
Country Hills Library (2004-) - 11950 Country Village Link N.E.
Saddletowne Library (2012-) - 150 7555 Falconridge Boulevard NE (at the Genesis Centre)
Village Square Library (1983-) - 2623 56 Street N.E. (at Village Square Leisure Centre)

Former branches

Crescent Heights Library (1913-1994) - 1806 1 Street NW
Inglewood Library (1946-1953) - 13334A 9 Avenue SE
Hillhurst Library (1947-1970) - 1135 Kensington Road SE
Glengarry Library (1950-1976) - 2609 19 Avenue SW
Former Bowness Library Locations (1964-)(Bowness opened as a town library in 1958, joining the Calgary system in 1964) - multiple addresses
Administration Building & Technical Reference Library (1958-1963) - 624 9 Avenue SW
Chinook Mall Library (1960-1998) - B55-6457 Macleod Trail SW
W.R. Castell Central Library (1963-2018) - 616 Macleod Tr S.E.
Westbrook Library (1964-1970) - 24-1200 37 Street SW
Georgina Thomson Library (1965-2003) - 51 Cornell Road NW
Downtown branch (1967-1977) 527 7th Avenue SW
Sir Winston Churchill Community Library (1970-1975) - 5220 37 Street NW
Shaganappi Library (1970-2016) - 3415 8 Avenue SW
Varsity Library (1976-1988) - 4616 Varsity Drive NW
Macleod Library (1979-1985) - 100-10325 Bonaventure Drive SE
Millican-Ogden Library (1986-2001) - 7005 18 Street SE
Midnapore Library (1998-2001) - 240 Midpark Way SE
Glenmore Square Library (2001-2016) - 7740 18 Street SE

Renamed branches 
Judith Umbach Library (formerly Thorn-Hill Library) was renamed after a major renovation in 2015 and for funds donated by Judith Umbach.
Nicholls Family Library (formerly Westbrook Library) was named to commemorate a donation made the Nicholls family.
Giuffre Family Library (formerly Alexander Calhoun Library) was renamed to commemorate a donation made by the Giuffre family. A section was commemorated to Alexander Calhoun at Memorial Park Library.

Services 
 Information and reference services
 Access to full text databases
 Community information
 Internet access
 Reader's advisory services
 Programs for children, youth and adults
 Delivery to home-bound individuals
 Inter-library loans
 Free downloadable audiobooks
 Printing services at all locations except Rocky Ridge
 Wellness desk at Central and Crowfoot Libraries
 Build a book bag
 Free program and quiet study rooms at all locations except Rocky Ridge

Statistics 
Calgary Public Library Facts (2012):
 Annual circulation:  17,121,718 (including renewals)
 Number of items in collection: 2,195,354
 Total number of books to choose from: 1,689,315
 Total number of e-books to choose from: 61,000 (2013 Report to the Community)
 Total number of music items to choose from: 155.563
 Total number of magazines to choose from: 87,648
 Total number of Blu-rays/DVDs to choose from: 188,005
 Percentage of households that utilize the Calgary Public Library: 66%
 Number of Calgarians who hold a library card:  670,000 + (2018)

See also 
 List of Carnegie libraries in Canada

References

External links 

 
 Annual reports and other publications
 Branch locations and hours
 Canadian Library Association - A Pocket History of Calgary

Public libraries in Alberta
Carnegie libraries in Canada
Leadership in Energy and Environmental Design certified buildings in Canada
Libraries established in 1912
1912 establishments in Alberta